The National Resources Commission was a powerful organ of the Executive Yuan of the Republic of China that existed from 1932 to 1952 and was responsible for industrial development and the management of public enterprises. It was staffed entirely by technocrats who reported directly to the Nationalist leader Chiang Kai-shek. The significance of the National Resources Commission stemmed from the leading role it played in industrial development during the two decades of Kuomintang "tutelage" over China. 

The National Resources Commission was secretly formed as the National Defense Planning Commission (國防設計委員會) in 1932 in Nanjing with a staff of fifty technical experts to plan industrial mobilization in preparation for the Second Sino-Japanese War. The immediate catalyst for the formation of the National Defense Planning Commission was the Japanese invasion of Manchuria in 1931. Its immediate goal was to design and implement defense-related industries to make China self-sufficient in impending war with Japan.

The National Defense Planning Commission was renamed the National Resources Commission in 1935 to reflect its role beyond defense-related industries. It soon grew into a large bureaucracy that was involved in managing a large state-owned industrial sector and in coordinating foreign trade. By 1947, it had a staff of 33,000 who supervised 230,000 workers, mostly in public enterprises. Due mainly to the nationalization major industries by the Nationalist Government, the NRC would gain control of 70% of Chinese industry.

The National Resources Commission was particularly interested in surveying and exploiting natural minerals and ores, and succeeded in importing entire industrial plants and sending its personnel to train abroad. The engineers of the National Resources Commission were influenced by Sun Yat-sen's Industrial Development and tied the need for economic "reconstruction" with national defense. The NRC successfully moved major industries into the Chinese interior when the Nationalist Government under Chiang Kai-shek retreated to Chongqing. To supply the government-controlled areas with electricity, the NRC proposed to build the Three Gorges Dam (the National Defense Planning Commission had made the first ever engineering survey of the site in 1932), though the project would not come to fruition until the 1990s.

At the end of the Chinese Civil War in 1949, the staff of the NRC was split. A portion of the NRC stayed in mainland China to work under the new People's Republic of China, while the rest fled to Taiwan with the KMT. A number of former NRC engineers rose to top government posts in Taiwan, including one premier (Sun Yun-suan) and eight ministers of economic affairs. In contrast, many NRC leaders who stayed behind in mainland China later found themselves persecuted during the Anti-Rightist Campaign and the Cultural Revolution for having been a part of the old order.

The Republic of China government on Taiwan abolished the NRC in 1952. It functions were overtaken by the Council on U.S. Aid and the Industrial Development Commission.

References

Government of the Republic of China